USS Los Angeles has been the name of more than one United States Navy ship or airship, and may refer to:
*, a tanker in commission from 1917 to 1919
, an airship in commission from 1924 to 1932
, a heavy cruiser in commission from 1945 to 1963
, a submarine in commission from 1976 to 2010

United States Navy ship names